The Liga Nacional Juvenil is the second level of the Spanish football league system for youth players 19 years old and under. It is administered by the RFEF and regional football federations. Currently the Liga Nacional has seventeen regional groups plus four groups from the autonomous region of the Canarias. Each Liga Nacional group has 16 to 18 teams with the winner (except for the 2nd or B teams) of each group promoted to the División de Honor and the last three placed teams are relegated to their respective regional group. The runners-up of the stronger groups are also promoted.

2021–22 Groups

note:From the 2013–14 season, there is maximum of one team from Ceuta and Melilla in the División de Honor and one team each in the Liga Nacional. The non-relegated team from Ceuta (Group14) and Melilla (Group13) are eligible for promotion to the División de Honor if there is an opening. If either region has both teams relegated from both the División de Honor and the Liga Nacional, the relegated Division de Honor team(s) enters the Liga Nacional and the Territorial champion(s) is directly promoted to the División de Honor. If the relegated División de Honor team was directly promoted in the previous season, it shall be relegated to its Territorial league and the Territorial runner-up is promoted to the Liga Nacional. Four Andalusian teams are relegated from both groups.

Canarias Preferente

Play-offs: Winners of Tenerife playoffs promoted to División de Honor

External links
Group 1 — Group 2 — Group 3 — Group 4 — Group 5 — Group 6 — Group 7 — Group 8 — Group 9 — Group 10 — Group 11 — Group 12 — Group 13 — Group 14 — Group 15 — Group 16 — Group 17 — Preferente Tenerife — Preferente Gran Canaria — Preferente Lanzarote y Fuerteventura — Preferente La Palma

 
Juvenil
Youth football in Spain
Spain